St Theresa’s Cathedral is a parish of the Roman Catholic Church and the cathedral of the Metropolitan Archdiocese of Juba in South Sudan. The cathedral church is located on Unity Avenue in Bahr al Jabal (Central Equatoria) in the district of Kator in the city of Juba,

Construction of the church began in 1952. It was designated the cathedral upon the erection of the Archdiocese of Juba (Latin: Archidioecesis Iubaensis) on December 12, 1974 by Pope Paul VI with the bull Cum in Sudania.

During the civil war in southern Sudan, about 5,000 people took refuge in the cathedral, which was kept shut for days by violent clashes between rival factions of the national army.

See also
Catholic Church in South Sudan

References

Roman Catholic cathedrals in South Sudan
Buildings and structures in Juba
Roman Catholic churches completed in 1952
20th-century Roman Catholic church buildings